R&D Sport is a Japanese racing team currently competing in the Super GT series.

Racing history 
R&D Sport was created in 1991 as a race car management, maintenance, and manufacturing company and expanded to JGTC, racing under the company's own name in 2002.

Super Formula 
The team first competed in Japanese Formula 3000 in 1992 as AD Racing with Finnish driver Mika Salo. The team changed to Navi Connection Racing in 1995 with driver Masahiko Kageyama taking third place at Suzuka in 1995 and third place at Fuji in 1996. Masami Kageyama, younger brother of Masahiko Kageyama, followed his sibling to third place at Fuji in 1997. A third-place finish at Fuji in 2000  from driver Shinsuke Shibahara would be R&D Sports' last podium in Formula Nippon.

Super GT 

In 2001 R&D Sport moved to the JGTC in a Porsche 911 GT3 R driven by Shinsuke Shibahara and Shogo Mitsuyama. 2002 would be the first successful year of JGTC competition, changing to a new Vemac RD320R, Shibahara and Mitsuyama would win three rounds of the season, taking victory at Fuji, Twin Ring Motegi, and Mine Circuit and finishing second in the drivers' championship.

R&D moved to GT500 with a Vemac RD350R in 2003, but they would not have the success of the last season, being unable to properly compete with the factory teams of GT500. As a result, the team dedicated 2004 to further developing their new Vemac RD408R competing in only one race of the season.

2005 would see the team move back to the GT300 class, as an accident with the team's RD408R ruined the planned GT500 effort. Instead R&D Sport was forced to use their Vemac RD350R from the 2003 season in the GT300 class, as it was no longer competitive in GT500. The team ran two cars in 2006 with Shogo Mitsuyama and Nobuteru Taniguchi winning at Okayama and taking third in the drivers' championship. Drivers Shinsuke Shibahara and Hiroyuki Yagi won the next round at Fuji and finished sixth in the drivers championship.

Shinsuke Shibahara and Haruki Kurosawa achieved victory at Autopolis in 2007, finishing third in the drivers' championship.

R&D Sport began a partnership with Subaru in 2009 using an AWD Subaru Legacy B4 that debuted at the sixth round of the season at Suzuka. However the car developed problems with its front differential and was retired from the race.

2010 was a shift from the disappointing performance of the Legacy in 2009, by changing the car from an AWD setup to FR, Kota Sasaki and Tetsuya Yamano won at Suzuka. 2011 was an even better performance, with Sasaki and Yamano winning at both Suzuka and Autopolis, finishing fourth overall in the drivers' championship.

STI and R&D Sport began a joint partnership in 2012 with STI general director Eiji Tatsumi taking over as team principal and a new Subaru BRZ for the 2012 season.

In 2013 the team achieved victory at the fifth round of the season at Suzuka, with drivers Kota Sasaki and Tetsuya Yamano finishing fourth in the drivers' championship. At the eighth round of the series Tetsuya Yamano announced his retirement after the end of the 2013 season.

Yamano's replacement, Takuto Iguchi and Kota Sasaki win at Fuji and finish 5th in the drivers' championship in 2014.

The 2015 season is less successful than the previous year with the year's best finish being a third place podium at Suzuka. Drivers Takuto Iguchi and Hideki Yamauchi finished the season twelfth overall in the driver's championship.

The 2016 season is more successful than the previous year with the year's best finish being a win at Suzuka, third place podium at Sportland Sugo and Fuji. Drivers Takuto Iguchi and Hideki Yamauchi finished the season sixth overall in the driver's championship.

The 2017 season is less successful than the previous year with the year's best finish being a second place podium at Autopolis. Drivers Takuto Iguchi and Hideki Yamauchi finished the season ninth overall in the driver's championship.

The 2018 season is more successful than the previous year with the year's best finish being a third place podium at Suzuka and win at Sportland Sugo. Drivers Takuto Iguchi and Hideki Yamauchi finished the season eighth overall in the driver's championship.

The 2019 season is very worst successful than the previous year with the year's best finish being a third place podium at Suzuka. Drivers Takuto Iguchi and Hideki Yamauchi finished the season eighteenth overall in the driver's championship.

The 2020 season is very more successful than the previous year with the year's best finish being a second place podium at Fuji and third place podium at Twin Ring Motegi. Drivers Takuto Iguchi and Hideki Yamauchi finished the season fifth overall in the driver's championship.

The 2021 season is The 1st Champion than the previous year with the year's best finish being win at SUGO, a second place podium at Fuji and third place podium at Fuji and Autopolis. Drivers Takuto Iguchi and Hideki Yamauchi finished the season first overall in the driver's championship.

Results

Super GT (JGTC)

Super Formula (Formula Nippon, Japanese Formula 3000)

References 

Japanese auto racing teams
Super GT teams
Auto racing teams established in 1991